Brahma Putrudu is a 1988 Telugu-language film directed by Dasari Narayana Rao and produced by D. Ramanaidu under the Suresh Productions banner. It stars Venkatesh and Rajani , with music composed by Chakravarthy. The film was a remake of the Tamil film  Michael Raj. The film was a Super Hit at the box office. Venkatesh won Filmfare Award for Best Actor - Telugu.

Plot
Sreedevi (Shalini) is a daughter of Kiranmayi (Jayasudha), a mad woman. Everyone makes fun of Sreedevi for not knowing who her father is, and the doctor says that her mother can become normal only when she sees the person who is responsible for her pregnancy. In the process of searching for her father, Sreedevi meets Shakthi (Venkatesh), a kind-hearted gentleman who always thinks of helping others. After listening to her story, he decides to help her at any cost. Shakthi falls in the same category as Sreedevi: when Shakthi was a child, his mother was imprisoned because of trickery played by his deceitful father and he has lost her whereabouts. Ammadu (Rajani) and Shakthi both love each other. Will Shakthi succeed in finding Sreedevi's father? Will he be able to meet his mother?

Cast

 Venkatesh as Shakthi
 Rajani as Ammadu
 Mohan Babu as Ranjeeth
 Jayasudha as Kiranmayi
 Nutan Prasad as Guru Murthy
 Srividya as Janaki
 Baby Shalini as Sridevi
 Allu Ramalingaiyah as Tatarao
 Suthivelu as S. I. Simham
 Nagesh as Constable Engeenayalu
 Mada as Tailor
 Ramana Reddy as Shakthi's assistant
 Potti Veeraiah as Shakthi's assistant
 Gundu Hanumantha Rao as Constable
 Jaya Prakash Reddy as S.P.
 Prabha as Rekha
 Radhakumari as Rekha's Mother
 Jayamalini as Constable Geeta
 Y. Vijaya as Sundari

Soundtrack

Music composed by Chakravarthy. Lyrics written by Dasari Narayana Rao. Music released on Annapurna Music Company.

Awards
Baby Shalini won the Nandi Award for Best Child Actress (1988)

References

External links

1988 films
Films scored by K. Chakravarthy
Films directed by Dasari Narayana Rao
Telugu remakes of Tamil films
Indian drama films
1980s Telugu-language films
Suresh Productions films